Archie Brennan (1931-2019) was a noted Scottish tapestry weaver. He served his apprenticeship at the Edinburgh Tapestry Co (later to become the Dovecot Studios) and studied at Edinburgh College of Art. He went on to work at the College establishing their department of Tapestry and Fibre Arts. He also served Dovecot as their artistic director.

He was described in 2019 as "possibly the greatest Scottish Pop artist you have never heard of".

In 2020 the Dovecot Gallery raised over £25,000 by a public appeal, to support a major retrospective exhibition of 80 of Brennan's tapestries in March–June 2021.

Professional Service
 Acting Chairman of the British Crafts Center
 President of the Society of Scottish Artists (1977/8)

Selected publications
 Brennan, Archie. (1978). Archie Brennan: tapestries & rugs. Oxford: Oxford Gallery.
 Brennan, Archie and the Scottish Arts Council. (1971). Archie Brennan: tapestry. Edinburgh: Scottish Arts Council.
 Brennan, A., Maffei, S. M., Stone, S., D'Allessandro, M., Lane, M., & New Jersey Center for Visual Arts. (2003). Contemporary tapestry: Archie Brennan, Susan Martin Maffei : November 9, 2003 – January 4, 2004.

Personal site
http://www.brennan-maffei.com/

References

External links
The Archie Brennan Project "a multi-faceted plan to bring Archie’s works to a broader audience"

1931 births
2019 deaths
Tapestry artists
British textile artists
British pop artists
20th-century Scottish male artists
21st-century Scottish male artists
20th-century textile artists
21st-century textile artists
Alumni of the Edinburgh College of Art
Presidents of the Society of Scottish Artists